Mohammad Kazemi (also Romanized as Moḩammad Kāz̧emī; also known as Qaryeh-e Moḩammad Kāz̧emī) is a village in Meydavud Rural District, Meydavud District, Bagh-e Malek County, Khuzestan Province, Iran. At the 2006 census, its population was 381, in 72 families.

References 

Populated places in Bagh-e Malek County